Hildegardia may refer to:
 Hildegardia (insect), a genus of insect in the family Tetrigidae
 Hildegardia (plant), a genus of flowering plants in the family Malvaceae